Notosemus is a genus of parasitoid wasps belonging to the family Ichneumonidae. There are about eight described species in Notosemus, found in Europe.

Species:
 Notosemus albimaculatus Sheng & Sun, 2016
 Notosemus bohemani (Wesmael, 1855)
 Notosemus inornatus Gokhman, 1993
 Notosemus planus Sheng & Sun, 2016
 Notosemus polyambonios Kusigemati, 1986
 Notosemus rufomaculatus (Cameron, 1903)
 Notosemus variegatus (Tosquinet, 1903)
 Notosemus wugongicus Sheng & Sun, 2016

References

Ichneumonidae
Ichneumonidae genera